Koderma Wildlife Sactuary is located in the northern part of Koderma (community development block) in the Koderma subdivision of the Koderma district in the state of  Jharkhand, India.

Geography

Location                                                                  

Note: The map alongside presents some of the notable locations in the district. All places marked in the map are linked in the larger full screen map.

The sanctuary
Koderma Forest Division has 15062.77 hectare as a reserved forest. “The reserved forest area of Koderma district is declared as wild life sanctuary and is under administrative control of wild life division Hazaribagh”. The principal trees in the forests are:  Sal, Bija, Gamhar, Khair, Palash, Salai, Semal, Bair, Arjun, Karam, Siris, Kaj, Kend, Mahulan, Mahua, Karanj, Ratti etc

Koderma wildlife sanctuary comprisesof  hilly ranges of dry deciduous forests and has plenty of rivulets. The wild life includes tiger, leopard, sloth bear, sambhar, cheetal, barking deer, nilgai, wild boar, giant squirrel, jackal, fox, hyaena, langur, porcupine etc. besides a variety of bird and reptile species.

There are watch towers at Dwajadhari Pahar, Meghatari and Taraghati.

There is a forest rest houses at Meghatari.Koderma has various government and private facilities for fooding and lodging. 

Animal sightings are a matter of chance and Koderma Wildlife Sanctuary is not a zoological garden. It is more than a picnic place. Drinking liquor and merry-making in the name of entertainment will not be handled lightly.

References

Chota Nagpur dry deciduous forests
Wildlife sanctuaries in Jharkhand
Koderma district
1985 establishments in Bihar
Protected areas established in 1985